Charles Richard Crews (born May 30, 1988) is an American race car driver from Dallas, Texas.

An early graduate of a Dallas prep school, he competed in the Indy Racing League's development system, winning the first Formula Mazda race he entered at age 14. He then ran eleven races over three seasons for four different teams in the Indy Lights championship, most prominently with Michael Crawford Motorsports during 2007. At the time of his debut he was the youngest driver ever to compete in what was then called the Indy Pro Series.

He has also competed in the 24 Hours of Daytona, the Star Mazda Championship, and in championship karting. He has competed in both domestic and international races on four continents.

Despite his relative inexperience, he hoped to compete in the 2007 Indianapolis 500 for SWE, but his deal with the team fell through. He was then linked to securing an entry for the 2008 Indianapolis 500. However, he was unable to complete rookie orientation due to rainy weather during the designated time period. He competed in the 2008 24 Hours of Daytona in the GT class.

Motorsports career results

American open-wheel racing results
(key) (Races in bold indicate pole position)

Indy Lights

24 Hours of Daytona 
(key)

Complete WeatherTech SportsCar Championship results
(key) (Races in bold indicate pole position; results in italics indicate fastest lap)

Complete European Le Mans Series results
(key) (Races in bold indicate pole position; results in italics indicate fastest lap)

* Season still in progress.

References

External links 
 
 
 C.R. Crews Indy Lights race history at ChampCarStats.com

Living people
1988 births
Racing drivers from Dallas
University of Texas at Dallas alumni
Indy Lights drivers
Indy Pro 2000 Championship drivers
24 Hours of Daytona drivers

Asian Le Mans Series drivers
WeatherTech SportsCar Championship drivers
European Le Mans Series drivers
Le Mans Cup drivers